The Sunrise Ruby is the world's most expensive ruby, most expensive coloured gemstone, and most expensive gemstone other than a diamond. 

Originally mined in Myanmar, its current name is derived from a poem of the same name, written by the 13th-century Sufi poet Rumi.

Description

It is considered among the rarest of all gemstones. The Swiss Gemmological Institute has described it as "a unique treasure of nature" and praised its "well-proportioned cut, highly attractive colour and fine purity". The Gubelin Gem Lab in Zürich stated that "such a combination of characteristics is very rare in Burmese rubies of this size." The global chairman of Sotheby's  International Jewellery Division, David Bennett, when interviewed on the ruby, stated "during his 40 years in the industry, he has never before seen a ruby of this calibre". In a Gubelin grading report ,it notes, "ruby is of Burmese origin" and that "its vivid but saturated color, poetically referred to as pigeon blood red, is due to a combination of well balanced trace elements in the stone, typical and characteristic for the finest rubies of Mogok." Gemstones of the same quality typically form in only small crystals, making this one an "extremely rare" gem.

Magnificent and Noble Jewels auction
The Sunrise Ruby was part of the annual Magnificent and Noble Jewels sale by Sotheby's Geneva, with sales at a total of US$160.9 million. Other auction items included "The Historic Pink", a pink diamond mounted a ring with a classic non-modified cushion cut.

Price and ownership
The ruby sold for a record US$30.42 million on 12 May 2015 at a Sotheby's auction in Geneva, Switzerland to an anonymous buyer. It was originally estimated to be worth between US$12 and 18 million prior to auction and bidding started at 11 million Swiss francs or US$11.8 million. Also known as lot 502 of the evening, bidding lasted approximately 7 minutes with buyers via phone as the main source of bidding. The Sunrise Ruby greatly surpassed the previous record holder, the Graff ruby ring, which sold for US$8.6 million in November 2014. Its record-setting price has been attributed to the rapid increase in prices for coloured gemstones and public auctions, with figures often "rivaling the performance of the much-sought-after colored diamonds".

See also
 Black Prince's Ruby
 DeLong Star Ruby
 Liberty Bell Ruby
 Neelanjali Ruby
 Prince of Burma
 Rosser Reeves Ruby
 Timur ruby

References

Individual rubies